Ismaʿīl ibn ʿĪsā ibn Mūsā al-Hāshimī was an Abbasid personage and governor of Egypt.

The son of Isa ibn Musa, he was appointed to Egypt by his second cousin Harun al-Rashid in 798. After an administration lasting for a few months, he was dismissed and replaced with al-Layth ibn al-Fadl.

Notes

References
  
 
 
 
 

Abbasid governors of Egypt
Abbasids
8th-century Abbasid governors of Egypt
8th-century Arabs
Year of birth unknown
Year of death unknown